Magkakabaung, is a 2014 Philippine drama independent film directed, written and edited by Jason Paul Laxamana. The film is known for winning the NETPAC Award for Best Asian Film at the 3rd Hanoi International Film Festival in Vietnam in November 2014. The film was also an official entry at the New Wave Category of the 40th Metro Manila Film Festival.

Plot
A single father accidentally kills his eight-year-old daughter by administering the wrong medication. He finds it challenging not only to have her body buried but also to bury his culpability.

Cast
Allen Dizon as Randy
Gladys Reyes as Mabel
Chanel Latorre as Neri
Emilio Garcia as Mr. Canda
Felixia Crysten Dizon as Angeline

Production
Magkakabaung was shot with Kapampangan as the primary language accompanied with English subtitles.

Release
Magkakabaung was first released at the Montréal World Film Festival on 29 August 2014. It was first shown in the United States on 11 September 2014 at the Harlem International Film Festival. The Hong Kong premiere for the film was on 12 November 2014 at the Hong Kong Asian Film Festival, and in Vietnam on 23 November 2014 at the Hanoi International Film Festival. The film premiered at the Austin Film Society in the United States on 11 December 2014. Magkakabaung was released in the Philippines on 17 December 2014 as an official entry of the New Wave Category at the 40th Metro Manila Film Festival.

Reception
The Network for the Promotion of Asian Cinema described the film, which was shown at the 3rd Hanoi International Film Festival, as "an emotionally rich journey that is free of sentimentality. By slowly and confidently unveiling a hero we believe in, we encounter the unseen and never doubt the truthfulness of this experience."

Quezon City Representative Winston Castelo filed House Resolution No. 1744, which sought to commend Magkakabaungs director Jason Paul Laxamana, citing, "Laxamana deserves all the praise and recognition for bringing pride, glory and honor to the country."

Awards

References

External links
 

2014 films
Philippine independent films
Philippine drama films